63 Cygni is a single star in the northern constellation of Cygnus, located around 1,030 light years away from Sun. It is visible to the naked eye as an orange-hued star with an apparent visual magnitude of 4.56. 63 Cyg is moving closer to the Earth with a heliocentric radial velocity of −26 km/s.

This is an evolved star showing a stellar spectrum with mixed traits between a bright giant and supergiant.  It has been chosen as a spectral standard for the class of K4 Ib–IIa.

For reasons that are not yet clear, 63 Cygni is displaying very long period (982 days) and low-amplitude (742 m/s) variations in radial velocity. The star has expanded to 35 times the Sun's radius and is radiating 4,397 times the Sun's luminosity from its photosphere at an effective temperature of 4,204 K.

References

K-type supergiants
K-type bright giants
Cygnus (constellation)
Cygni, f02
Durchmusterung objects
Cygni, 63
201251
104194
8089